Champions is a 2023 American  sports comedy film directed by Bobby Farrelly in his solo directorial debut, from a screenplay written by Mark Rizzo. It is an English-language remake of the 2018 Spanish film of the same name. The film stars Woody Harrelson as a temperamental minor-league basketball coach who after an arrest must coach a team of players with intellectual disabilities as community service; Kaitlin Olson, Ernie Hudson, and Cheech Marin also star.

Champions was released in the United States on March 10, 2023, by Focus Features. The film received mixed reviews from critics and has grossed $12 million.

Plot

Marcus Marokovich, a hot tempered but skilled assistant coach with a minor league basketball team in Iowa, lets his temper get the best of him during a game and shoves the head coach, Phil. After leaving the stadium, he gets drunk at a local bar and while driving home he hits a police car, ending up in jail. The next day he is bailed out by Phil. He gets into an argument with Phil, believing that he was right and if Phil had listened, none of the previous night would've happened. Phil explains why he didn't listen to Marcus and advises him that he needs to get to know players as more than that and that they have personal lives that affect their playing. He then tells Marcus he's been let go by the owners.

When Marcus appears for his hearing, the judge gives him a choice of 18 months in prison or 90 days of community service with a local community center's intellectually challenged basketball team, The Friends. He agrees to community service and soon realizes coaching this team will be a personal and professional challenge. At the end of the first practice, he accepts a ride home with Johnny, one of the players, only to find that the driver is a former Tinder one night stand and Johnny's sister, Alex. He and Alex begin a casual sexual relationship while he learns how to coach the new team.

The team begins to improve and Marcus soon realize that the players are more than just their skills as he gets to know them personally. As one of the team members, Darius, refuses to play for Marcus, a formerly injured player, Consentino, is put back in the rotation and Marcus meets her on their way to an away game. The team is kicked off the bus when the team "disrupts" the other passengers and Johnny calls his sister to pick them up in her Shakespeare travel RV. Fortunately, Marcus and the team are able to convince her to be their driver for away games.

Johnny becomes more attached to Marcus and invites him to dinner and once there, Marcus shares Johnny's news about moving into a group home with some of The Friends. Alex becomes defensive and tells Marcus to stay out of family business and he leaves the home, but Alex confronts him in the yard and after an argument, tells Marcus they are over. Johnny becomes angry with Marcus for hurting his sister and lying to him and refuses to play but during halftime of a game, Consentino lets him know he isn't playing for coach, he's playing for the rest of the team, so he needs to get over it.

Marcus has asked one of the assistant coaches with his former team, Sonny, who has an uncle that is a GM with the NBA to help him find a new job but his uncle shuts him down. Sonny leads Marcus on for a while, hoping they will become friends but realizes Marcus was just being nice to him to get an NBA job. When Marcus realizes how manipulative he's been, he asks Sonny to help him with coaching The Friends and he agrees.

Benny, one of the players that works at a local restaurant, has been unable to play in games because his boss refuses to allow him to adjust his schedule. Once the team is able to make it to the semi-finals, he tells his boss he should be able to adjust his schedule to play with the team and is fired, but he is now able to play and is one of the key scorers. Marcus and Phil meet by chance in a restaurant and Phil lets Marcus know that Darius, the teammate who refuses to play for Marcus, had a promising career before he was involved in a terrible car accident and ended up with brain damage. Marcus realizes it was a drunk driver who hit Darius and he goes to his home just to apologize and explain he would never drive drunk again, but that he understand why Darius won't play for him. Darius realizing he needs to be able to forgive the woman that hit him, decides to begin with Marcus and agrees to go to the Special Olympics finals in Winnipeg.

Marcus receives news that he has been hired by the NBA team in Seattle as a third assistant but Alex tells him it sounds like they are using his feel-good story as a cover for their current scandal. When he tells The Friends he is moving to Seattle, they cannot bring themselves to be happy, knowing it will take him away and Johnny becomes angry with him again. Marcus is told by the community center manager, Julio, that the city and state do not have the money to send the players to Canada so he devises a scheme with Alex to blackmail the owner of the restaurant where Benny worked and they are able to attend the finals. The Friends are intimidated by the size and name of the opposing team, The Beasts, and it shows in their playing, so when they are down during the halftime, Marcus brings up all the situations that they've conquered and calls them Champions. When returning to the court, Johnny proceeds up the stairs to have his "Champion" moment by telling Alex he is moving in with his friends.

The Friends rally during the second half and are within one point of winning, so Marcus tries to set up a play that will have Darius making the final shot. His assistant coach says it's a bad idea as the other team knows Darius is the best player and they will be all over him. Marcus begins to reprimand him like Phil had done to him but catches himself and realizes the assistant is right and sets up a pick and roll play with Johnny. The play works and Johnny is about to make the basket when another player, Showtime, yells he is open and Johnny passes him the ball, only for Showtime to make his trademark move of a backward shot. He misses the basket but hits the rim, and the team goes wild because he had never before hit the rim. Sadly it results in the team's loss, but they still see themselves as Champions because of Marcus's pep talk.

Marcus decides not to take the Seattle job, realizing that Alex was right, and he is offered a local coaching job at Drake University off the recommendation of the coach (the one he pushed ) of the NBA "J-league team the Iowa Stallions. His former assistant takes over the coaching of The Friends, Marcus and Alex begin dating, and Johnny moves in with his friends at the group home.

Cast
 Woody Harrelson as Marcus, a disgraced G-league basketball coach.
 Kaitlin Olson as Alex, Johnny's sister and Marcus' love interest
 Matt Cook as Sonny, an assistant coach
 Ernie Hudson as Phil Perretti, a fellow coach and Marcus' friend 
 Cheech Marin as Julio, the manager of the rec center where the Friends practice.
 Mike Smith as Attorney McGurk
 Scott Van Pelt as himself
 Jalen Rose as himself

The Friends 
 Madison Tevlin as Consentino 
 Joshua Felder as Darius 
 Kevin Iannucci as Johnny 
 Ashton Gunning as Cody  
 Matthew Von Der Ahe as Craig  
 Tom Sinclair as Blair  
 James Day Keith as Benny  
 Alex Hintz as Arthur  
 Casey Metcalfe as Marlon  
 Bradley Edens as Showtime

Production
Principal photography took place in Winnipeg, Manitoba, Canada from November to December 2021. Extras were sought via a casting call through St. Amant, a non-profit organization that works with Manitobans who have developmental disabilities and autism.

Release
Champions was originally scheduled to be theatrically released in the United States on March 24, 2023, by Focus Features, opposite Lionsgate's John Wick: Chapter 4. In January 2023, the release date was moved to March 10, 2023. The film had its red carpet premiere at the AMC Lincoln Square Theatre in New York on February 27, 2023.

Reception

Box office 
, Champions has grossed $10.6 million in the United States and Canada, and $1.5 million in other territories, for a worldwide total of $12.1 million.

In the United States and Canada, Champions was released alongside Scream VI and 65, and was projected to gross around $5million in its opening weekend. The film made $1.8 million on its first day. It went on to debut to $5.2 million, finishing in seventh. It made $3 million in its second weekend, finishing in eighth.

Critical response 
  Audiences surveyed by CinemaScore gave the film an average grade of "A" on an A+ to F scale, while those at PostTrak gave it an overall 83% positive score, with 66% saying they would definitely recommend it.

References

External links
 
 
 
 
 

American sports comedy films
2020s sports comedy films
Focus Features films
Basketball films
Films shot in Winnipeg
American remakes of Spanish films